The arrondissement of Albertville is an arrondissement of France in the Savoie department in the Auvergne-Rhône-Alpes region. It has 69 communes.

Composition

The communes of the arrondissement of Albertville, and their INSEE codes, are:
 
 Aime-la-Plagne (73006)
 Albertville (73011)
 Allondaz (73014)
 Les Allues (73015)
 Les Avanchers-Valmorel (73024)
 La Bâthie (73032)
 Beaufort (73034)
 Les Belleville (73257)
 Bonvillard (73048)
 Bourg-Saint-Maurice (73054)
 Bozel (73055)
 Brides-les-Bains (73057)
 Césarches (73061)
 Cevins (73063)
 Champagny-en-Vanoise (73071)
 Les Chapelles (73077)
 Cléry (73086)
 Cohennoz (73088)
 Courchevel (73227)
 Crest-Voland (73094)
 Esserts-Blay (73110)
 Feissons-sur-Salins (73113)
 Flumet (73114)
 Frontenex (73121)
 La Giettaz (73123)
 Gilly-sur-Isère (73124)
 Grand-Aigueblanche (73003)
 Grésy-sur-Isère (73129)
 Grignon (73130)
 Hautecour (73131)
 Hauteluce (73132)
 Landry (73142)
 La Léchère (73187)
 Marthod (73153)
 Mercury (73154)
 Montagny (73161)
 Montailleur (73162)
 Monthion (73170)
 Montvalezan (73176)
 Moûtiers (73181)
 Notre-Dame-de-Bellecombe (73186)
 Notre-Dame-des-Millières (73188)
 Notre-Dame-du-Pré (73190)
 Pallud (73196)
 Peisey-Nancroix (73197)
 La Plagne-Tarentaise (73150)
 Planay (73201)
 Plancherine (73202)
 Pralognan-la-Vanoise (73206)
 Queige (73211)
 Rognaix (73216)
 Sainte-Foy-Tarentaise (73232)
 Sainte-Hélène-sur-Isère (73241)
 Saint-Marcel (73253)
 Saint-Nicolas-la-Chapelle (73262)
 Saint-Paul-sur-Isère (73268)
 Saint-Vital (73283)
 Salins-Fontaine (73284)
 Séez (73285)
 Thénésol (73292)
 Tignes (73296)
 Tournon (73297)
 Tours-en-Savoie (73298)
 Ugine (73303)
 Val-d'Isère (73304)
 Venthon (73308)
 Verrens-Arvey (73312)
 Villard-sur-Doron (73317)
 Villaroger (73323)

History

The arrondissement of Albertville was created in 1860.

As a result of the reorganisation of the cantons of France which came into effect in 2015, the borders of the cantons are no longer related to the borders of the arrondissements. The cantons of the arrondissement of Albertville were, as of January 2015:

 Aime
 Albertville-Nord
 Albertville-Sud
 Beaufort
 Bourg-Saint-Maurice
 Bozel
 Grésy-sur-Isère
 Moûtiers
 Ugine

References

Albertville
Albertville